Sergei Andreyevich Luzhkov (born 11 October 1990) is a Russian former professional football player.

Club career
He played 3 seasons in the Russian Football National League for FC Yenisey Krasnoyarsk.

External links
 
 

1990 births
Living people
Russian footballers
Association football midfielders
FC Krasnodar players
FC Yenisey Krasnoyarsk players
FC Volga Ulyanovsk players